Greenville (formerly, Oregon Hill) is an unincorporated community in Yuba County, California, United States.

A post office operated at Greenville from 1857 to 1860.

References

Unincorporated communities in California
Populated places established in 1857
Unincorporated communities in Yuba County, California
1857 establishments in California